50 Foot Wave is an extended-play recording by American alternative-rock band 50 Foot Wave, released on March 23, 2004.

Track listing

Personnel
Kristin Hersh – vocals, guitars
Bernard Georges – bass
Rob Ahlers – drums, vocals

Production
Producer: Ethan Allen
Recorded by Ethan Allen and James Adam Watts
Mixing: Ethan Allen
Mastering: Joe Gastwirt at Joe's Mastering Joint
Design: Lakuna, Inc.

References

2004 EPs
50 Foot Wave albums
4AD EPs